Smoke Bend is an unincorporated community in Ascension Parish, Louisiana, United States.

A small cottage from the 1870s named Rome House, listed on the National Register of Historic Places, is located here.

It is located:
Latitude: 30.10833
Longitude: -91.02028
Elevation: 22 ft

Notable person
 Earl Ernest Veron - United States federal judge

References

Unincorporated communities in Ascension Parish, Louisiana
Unincorporated communities in Louisiana